London Buses route 607 is a Transport for London contracted bus route in London, England. Running between Uxbridge station and White City bus station, it is operated by Metroline.

History

Route 607 is one of the few limited-stop routes in London. It was established on 21 July 1990 as an express service on the same route as route 207 between Uxbridge station and Shepherd's Bush Green via Uxbridge Road on Mondays to Saturdays.

Its number was previously used by a trolleybus route over the same roads, which operated from 15 November 1936 until 8 November 1960 when it was abolished as part of the London Trolleybus Withdrawal Programme and replaced by bus route 207. It is the only regular route in the 6xx series that is otherwise reserved for school routes. (There had been 6xx limited-stop routes in the 1970s.)

When the route was established, it was operated by MCW Metrobuses, out of Hanwell and Uxbridge garages by CentreWest. The route was included in the sale of CentreWest to First London in March 1997.

In the early 2000s, it was proposed that the route be replaced by the West London Tram, however this project was abandoned in 2007. On 29 November 2008, route 607 was extended from Shepherd's Bush Green to White City bus station to coincide with the opening of Westfield London.

On 22 June 2013 route 607 was included in the sale of First London's Uxbridge garage to Metroline.

Current route
Route 607 operates via these primary locations:
Uxbridge station 
Hillingdon
Hayes End
Southall
Ealing Hospital
Hanwell
West Ealing for West Ealing station  
The Broadway for Ealing Broadway station   
Ealing Common station 
Acton Town Hall
Shepherd's Bush Market station 
Shepherd's Bush stations   
White City bus station for Wood Lane station

References

External links

Timetable

Bus routes in London
Transport in the London Borough of Ealing
Transport in the London Borough of Hammersmith and Fulham
Transport in the London Borough of Hillingdon